was a brief initial Japanese era of the Northern Court during the Kamakura period, after Gentoku and before Kenmu, lasting from April 1332 to April 1333. Reigning Emperors were Emperor Go-Daigo in the south and Emperor Kōgon in the north.

Nanboku-chō overview
   
During the Meiji period, an Imperial decree dated March 3, 1911 established that the legitimate reigning monarchs of this period were the direct descendants of Emperor Go-Daigo through Emperor Go-Murakami, whose Southern Court had been established in exile in Yoshino, near Nara.

Until the end of the Edo period, the militarily superior pretender-Emperors supported by the Ashikaga shogunate had been mistakenly incorporated in Imperial chronologies despite the undisputed fact that the Imperial Regalia were not in their possession.

This illegitimate Northern Court had been established in Kyoto by Ashikaga Takauji.

Change of era
 1332 :  The era name was changed to Shōkyō to mark an event or a number of events.  The previous era ended and a new one commenced in Genkō 2, the 10th month.

In this time frame, Genkō (1331–1333) was the Southern Court equivalent nengō.

Events of the Shōkyō era

Notes

References
 Nussbaum, Louis Frédéric and Käthe Roth. (2005). Japan Encyclopedia. Cambridge: Harvard University Press. ; OCLC 48943301
 Titsingh, Isaac. (1834). [Siyun-sai Rin-siyo/Hayashi Gahō, 1652]. Nipon o daï itsi ran; ou,  Annales des empereurs du Japon.  Paris: Oriental Translation Society of Great Britain and Ireland.

External links
 National Diet Library, "The Japanese Calendar" – historical overview plus illustrative images from library's collection

Japanese eras
1330s in Japan